Ralph Angelo Pasquariello (May 30, 1926January 5, 1999) was a professional American football fullback for the Los Angeles Rams and Chicago Cardinals.

Early years
Pasquariello authored an impressive record during his gridiron career, beginning at Everett High School where he was named "all-scholastic" in 1944.

College career
Pasquariello served in the US Army during World War II before attending Villanova University. He was a record setting fullback for Villanova from 1946 to 1949. During that four-year period, Villanova won 28 games, lost only 10 and tied 2. Pasquariello set a record for most carries with 380 and was second in individual career rushing with 1815 net yards gained.  Also during his college career, he played in the Great Lakes Bowl, was named to six all-star teams, including the All-America College Selection in 1948 and 1949, the All-American Catholic and All-East elevens, and the Associated Press All-Pennsylvania team.  In 1949, he scored the winning touchdown in the North–South Shrine Game, and was given the MVP award.

Professional 
His talents spread to the pro circuit, playing fullback for the Los Angeles Rams.  Pasquariello was the first round draft pick for the Rams in 1950.  He later spent three years with the Chicago Cardinals (1951–1953).

Honors 
The Annual Ralph Pasquariello Award, established in his honor by the Villanova Club of Boston, is given to the outstanding backfield performer in the Villanova-Boston College game.

In 1981, he was honored by being inducted into the Villanova University Varsity Club (Villanova University Hall of Fame).

References

External links
Database Football
Football Forum
Everett High School: Alum in Pros
St. Louis Draft Picks
NFL Draft History

1926 births
1999 deaths
Sportspeople from Everett, Massachusetts
Players of American football from Massachusetts
American football fullbacks
Villanova Wildcats football players
Los Angeles Rams players
Chicago Cardinals players
United States Army personnel of World War II